Queenscliff Lighthouse may refer to either of two lighthouses in Queenscliff, Victoria, Australia:

 Queenscliff High Light, also known as the Queenscliff Black Lighthouse
 Queenscliff Low Light, also known as the Queenscliff White Lighthouse